is a set of three dams in Hakuba, Nagano Prefecture, Japan.

Dams in Nagano Prefecture
Gravity dams